The 2014–15 Topklasse season was the fifth season of the third tier Dutch football league. A total of 32 teams participated: 24 from the 2012–13 Topklasse, and the remaining eight from the 2013–14 Hoofdklasse. As usual, the competition is divided into two leagues: "Saturday" and "Sunday", who differ by the day their games are usually played.

For the fourth consecutive season, no team was relegated from the Eerste Divisie, this time because all 2013–14 Topklasse teams had declined promotion into professionalism.

Teams

Saturday league

Sunday league

League tables

Saturday league

Sunday league

Championship final

Lienden won overall Topklasse title 3-0 on aggregate.

Promotion/relegation play-offs

Topklasse / Hoofdklasse playoff first round
In the first round the 3 period winners of each Hoofdklasse league decide which of them 3 continues in the semifinal. For details see Promotion/relegation play-off Topklasse - Hoofdklasse.

In the second/semifinal round, the 3 winners from the 3 Saturday Hoofdklasse leagues are joined with the team ranked 13th in the Saturday Topklasse league to play for 1 spot in the 2014–15 Topklasse Saturday league. Likewise, the 3 winners from the 3 Sunday Hoofdklasse leagues are joined with the team ranked 13th in the Sunday Topklasse league to play for 1 spot in the 2015–16 Topklasse Sunday league.

Topklasse / Hoofdklasse playoff semifinals

 Source:

Topklasse / Hoofdklasse playoff finals

 Source:  

RVVH and HBS Craeyenhout promoted to the 2015–16 Topklasse.

References 

Derde Divisie seasons
Neth
3